Mator or Motor was a Uralic language belonging to the group of Samoyedic languages, extinct since the 1840s. It was spoken in the northern region of the Sayan Mountains in Siberia, close to the Mongolian north border. The speakers of Mator lived in a wide area from the eastern parts of the Minusinsk District (okrug) along the Yenisei River to the region of Lake Baikal. Three dialects of Mator were recorded: Mator proper as well as Taygi and Karagas (occasionally portrayed as separate languages, but their differences are few). Mator was influenced by Mongolic, Tungusic and Turkic languages before it went extinct, and may have even been possibly influenced by the Iranic languages.

Today the term "Mator people" is simply an alternate name of the Koibal, one of the five territorial sub-division groups of the Khakas. (Note that the name "Koibal" likewise derives from the related Samoyedic Koibal language.)

Mator has been frequently grouped together with Selkup and Kamassian as "South Samoyedic". This is however a grouping by geographical area, and not considered to constitute an actual sub-branch of the Samoyedic languages.

Example of words in Mator 

 kälä = fish
 mondoh = root
 sörüh = rain
 kaduh = storm
 baada = word
 kaasa = human
 ämdä = horn
 täjbä = nail
 täär = divide, share
 köhö = winter
 öröh = autumn
 teite = four
 mən = me, I
 tən = you
 ter = hair
 ajba = head
siime = eye

References

 Helimski, Eugen. 1997. Die Matorische Sprache: Wörterbuch – Grundzüge der Grammatik – Sprachgeschichte.

External links
Mator–English glossary
Mator grammar and dictionary

Southern Samoyedic languages
Extinct languages of Asia
Languages extinct in the 19th century